Self Destruct is the third album by the American garage punk band the Original Sins. It was released in 1990 through Psonik Records. The CD version of the album included bonus tracks that originally appeared from their 1990 "Coca-Cola" 7" single.

Critical reception

The Chicago Tribune wrote that "John Terlesky's gravelly, abandoned vocals once again ride over searing guitar (with more than a few psychedelic/bluesy accents) and organ, bass and drums that are welded into blasts of raw rock 'n' roll sound." The New York Times determined that "the music is dense, droning pop, through which J. T.'s guitar and ragged vocals cut, gag, stumble and scream."

In 1998, The Philadelphia Inquirer deemed the album "fat-bottomed psychedelic metal."

Track listing
All songs written by John Terlesky

Personnel
The Original Sins
Ken Bussiere – bass guitar, backing vocals
Dave Ferrara – drums, backing vocals
Dan McKinney – organ
John Terlesky – vocals, guitar, production, illustrations, design

Additional musicians and production
Kevin Shire – photography
John Siket – engineering
J. Smith – art direction
Dave Stein – production
Maria Stoiancheff – photography

References

External links
 

The Original Sins albums
1990 albums